Apple Grove, West Virginia may refer to:

 Apple Grove, Mason County, West Virginia
 Apple Grove, McDowell County, West Virginia